"Apocalypse" is the fourth episode of the first series of British sitcom Bottom. It was first broadcast on 8 October 1991.

Synopsis
During a night at the fair to celebrate the pair inheriting £600, Richie receives a curse from a gypsy fortune teller.

Plot
Eddie and Richie are preparing for a visit from Richie's wealthy auntie, Olga. To create the impression of poverty they have killed their goldfish, 'Elvis', to make her believe they have no food left in the house; scattered bills strategically around the house so that she sees one wherever she sits; and Eddie has sprinkled water everywhere to make it look like they've been crying a lot.

When Richie phones to ensure she brings her cheque book, he is informed by her servant that she has died and left him £600 in her will.

Overjoyed, Richie safely ensconces £300 on top of the bathroom cabinet where he believes no one will ever find it, and the duo take the remaining £300 down to the funfair where Eddie causes £45 worth of damage to a shooting stall. Richie agrees to settle the debt only to discover that his wallet and the £300 have been stolen. In a bid to escape, Eddie asks the proprietor of the shooting stall (Mark Arden) to call it double or quits if he can shoot a particular target, however instead he deliberately shoots him in the eye so they can make their getaway.

Being chased through the funfair by the workers, the two hide first in the house of horrors and then in the fortune teller's tent. Here the old fortune teller (Liz Smith) reveals to Richie that she knows his driving licence to be a fake and then describes his "secret love picture". Convinced that the old woman has something (which Eddie believes to be dropsy) he asks her to tell his fortune and she reveals that before the moon rises three times, he will die.

Richie rushes to the hospital, where, after causing much havoc with the nurse (Helen Lederer) and the patients, he is granted a clean bill of health by Sir Roger Cobham (Roger Brierley), a famous heart surgeon, who kicks him out immediately afterward. Richie is relieved, but on the way out he and Eddie accidentally push an old man (Nick Gillard) down a lift shaft. Richie then comes to the conclusion that his death will be caused by an incident.

Three days later, Richie has created a bunker and has not left it for three days and nights nor has he eaten anything, as he has enlisted Eddie to test all of the food and drink for poisonings. Eddie has taken this task to heart, especially when testing alcohol.

After bribing Eddie to check if the moon has risen yet, Richie notices that the ceiling above him is sagging, and Eddie explains that it's his piano. Richie makes him go upstairs and move it. Richie prays that whatever fate awaits him be given instead to Eddie. His prayer is repeatedly interrupted by Eddie playing piano and just as Richie gets up to order Eddie to come down at once, Eddie and the piano crash through the ceiling, destroying Richie's bunker. It's only at this moment that Richie realises that everything that transpired leading him to get the curse was because of Eddie, who suggested they go to the fair, the one who shot the stallholder and suggested that they hide in the fortune teller's tent and then on the third night just before the moon rolls he dropped a piano on Richie's head. Realising that Eddie could be the cause of his death and intends get his hands on Aunty Olga's £300, Richie throws him out of the flat.

That night, as Richie is visited by the Grim Reaper, who informs him that he is going to hell. Richie pleads for his life, failing to notice that Death seems to have trouble with his mobility. It is revealed to the audience that Death is in fact Eddie on stilts in a robe.

Richie offers to play chess for his soul but 'Death' refuses, claiming he doesn't know the rules. He also refuses to play Cluedo because Richie always looks at the mystery cards. Eventually, Richie beats 'Death' in a game of I spy. 'Death' agrees to allow Richie to live in return for Eddie's return to the flat, the remaining £300 and the secret copy of 'girly world' magazine hidden under Richie's bed. 'Death' joyfully run-off the money and Richie's magazine but carelessly trips on the stairs breaking his stilts; Eddie is uncloaked and exposed to a furious Richie who is about to give his treacherous flatmate a fist.

While Richie and Eddie argue, the shooting-gallery stallholder kicks the door down looking for Richie, as he has come to return his missing wallet. They realise that it was the fortune teller who stole Richie's wallet, and therefore knew of its contents – the forged driving licence and Julia Somerville nude collage. The stallholder takes the £300 to pay for his eye operation and Richie's girly world magazine; as the stallholder is about to leave, Richie asks him if he would like to kick Eddie in the bollocks which he gladly does.

DVD edit
DVD releases of this episode have had an audio edit from the original television broadcast. At the funfair when Richie realises that his wallet is missing, he originally called the fair staff "thieving bastard gypos" (a derogatory nickname from "gypsies", i.e., Romani). In the DVD releases the word "gypos" has been replaced with "yobbos". However, the scene selection chapter is still entitled "gypos". Within the same scene, as part of the DVD edit, as Richie says "I know what you gypsies get up to when the lights go out...", a siren is added to the audio track as a distraction from another usage of the word "gypsies".

These edits had already been made by the time of the repeat broadcast on BBC2 on 10 July 1992, which contain the word "yobbos", as well as the siren overdub.

External links

Bottom – Apocalypse at the BBFC 

Bottom (TV series)
1991 British television episodes